Memmingen (Swabian: Memmenge) is a town in Swabia, Bavaria, Germany. It is the economic, educational and administrative centre of the Danube-Iller region. To the west the town is flanked by the Iller, the river that marks the Baden-Württemberg border. To the north, east and south the town is surrounded by the district of Unterallgäu (Lower Allgäu).

With about 42,000 inhabitants, Memmingen is the 5th biggest town in the administrative region of Swabia. The origins of the town go back to the Roman Empire. The old town, with its many courtyards, castles and patricians' houses, palaces and fortifications is one of the best preserved in southern Germany. With good transport links by road, rail and air, it is the transport hub for Upper Swabia and Central Swabia, and the Allgäu.

Due to its proximity to the Allgäu region, Memmingen is often called the Gateway to the Allgäu (Tor zum Allgäu). The town motto is Memmingen – Stadt mit Perspektiven ("Memmingen – a town with perspectives"). In recent times it has been frequently referred to as Memmingen – Stadt der Menschenrechte (Memmingen – the town of human rights). This alludes to the Twelve Articles, considered to be the first written set of human rights in Europe, which were penned in Memmingen in 1525. Every four years there is the Wallensteinfestspiel, with about 4,500 participants, the biggest historical reenactment in Europe. It commemorates the invasion of Wallenstein and his troops in 1630.

History

It is believed that on the site of present-day Memmingen in Roman times there was a small military town, probably called Cassiliacum. In the 5th century an Alemannic settlement was established and in the 7th century there was a palace belonging to the king of the Franks.

Memmingen was linked to Bohemia, Austria and Munich by the salt road to Lindau. Another important route through Memmingen was the Italian road from Northern Germany to Switzerland and Italy. Both roads helped Memmingen gain importance as a trading centre. In the Middle Ages, the place was known as Mammingin; in 1158 the Welfian Duke Welf VI founded the town of Memmingen. In 1286 it became an Imperial City, responsible only to the Holy Roman Emperor.

Christoph Schappeler, the preacher at St. Martin's in Memmingen during the early 16th century, was an important figure during the Protestant Reformation and the German Peasants' War. His support for peasant rights helped to draw peasants to Memmingen. The city first followed the Tetrapolitan Confession, and then the Augsburg Confession.

The Twelve Articles: The Just and Fundamental Articles of All the Peasantry and Tenants of Spiritual and Temporal Powers by Whom They Think Themselves Oppressed was written (probably by Schappeler and Sebastian Lotzer) in early 1525. This was a religious petition borrowing from Luther's ideas to appeal for peasant rights. Within two months of its publication in Memmingen, 25,000 copies of the tract were in circulation around Europe. These are the first known set of human rights documents in the world (if one ignores Magna Carta in England in 1215).

In the 1630s Memmingen was at centre stage during the Thirty Years' War, and the Imperial generalissimo Wallenstein was quartered in the town when he was dramatically dismissed from service. From 1632 Memmingen was briefly garrisoned by the Swedish army, and became a base of operations for Swedish troops in Swabia. In September 1647 the Imperialists under Adrian von Enkevort besieged the Swedish garrison, under Colonel Sigismund Przyemski. Two months later the town surrendered.

Following the reorganization of Germany in 1802, Memmingen became part of Bavaria. The 19th century saw the slow economic deterioration of the town, which was halted only with the building of a railway following the course of the River Iller.

Since World War II Memmingen has been a developing town, with a rate of economic growth above the average for Bavaria.

Geography
Memmingen is located at the western border of Bavaria at the river Iller, 50 km south of Ulm, and 100 km west of Munich. The landscape or region beginning with Memmingen is called Unterallgäu and forms a part of the region Mittelschwaben who is next to Oberschwaben and Allgäu. Memmingen is also sometimes called the Gate to the Allgäu.

Transport
Memmingen is reached by the A7 and the A96 motorways and Memmingen station is on railways connecting Munich and Lindau and the Ulm–Oberstdorf railway.

It has the public and international Memmingen Airport nearby.

Economy
Most companies are SMEs, such as the following:

 Alpine Hydraulik GmbH
 
 Dachser Logistics
 Gebrüder Weiss
 Gefro Reformversand Frommlet
 
 
 
 
 Metzeler Schaum GmbH
 
 Rohde & Schwarz

Politics
Although the Lord Mayor has been from the Social Democratic Party of Germany since 1966, the biggest party in the town council is traditionally the Christian Social Union.

The town politics is mostly dominated by a coalition of bigger parties ("coalition of the reasoned") from CSU, SPD, Christlicher Rathausblock Memmingen (Christian Town Hall Party Memmingen) and the Free Voters. The smaller parties of Ecological Democratic Party, Alliance '90/The Greens and the Free Democratic Party make up the opposition.

There was a hefty dispute between the parties in 2005, concerning financial participation in the Memmingen Airport. The Ecological Democratic Party and the Greens initiated a referendum to inhibit financial support for the airport, but this vote met with no success.

At the top of the town government is the Lord Mayor, who is elected directly by the people. He is the representative of the town and the leader of municipality. As second representatives, the majors are elected from the members of the town council. Historically the CSU, as biggest party, appoints the second major. The third major is appointed by the third biggest party. The second biggest party, the SPD, traditionally declines to appoint the third major, because they already appoint the Lord Mayor.

Memmingen is building, alongside the double centre Ulm/Neu-Ulm, the second economical centre in Upper Swabia. It thus leads the central supply function for the adjoining cities and districts.

Town council
The last local elections were on March 2, 2008, with following results:

¹ Christlicher Rathausblock Memmingen ("Christian Townhall-Party")

Lord Mayors
 1884–1909: Karl Scherer
 1910–1931: Fritz Braun
 1932–1945: Heinrich Berndl, NSDAP
 1945–1948: Georg Fey, CSU
 1948–1952: Lorenz Riedmiller, SPD
 1952–1966: Heinrich Berndl, without party
 1966–1968: Rudolf Machnig, SPD
 1968–1980: Johannes Bauer, SPD
 1980–2016: Ivo Holzinger, SPD
 2016: Markus Kennerknecht, SPD
 2017–today: Manfred Schilder, CSU

Town finances
With €512 per capita, Memmingen is one of the cities in Germany with the lowest level of debt (The German average is more than €1,300). The town had 2007 a management budget (Verwaltungshaushalt) of €94,925,160 and an asset budget (Vermögenshaushalt) of €19,490,860. The income from trade taxes amounted to about €40 million, the income tax assignment to about €20 million. The local rates were last changed in 2003. The town has many charitable foundations, with roots partly going back to the Middle Ages (such as the Unterhospitalstiftung).

Coat of arms and flag
Blazon: Split from gold and silver, in front a half, reinforced in red, black eagle. Backward a red pawcross

The town's colours, handed down since 1488, are Black, Red, White. The flag is a banner flag with cross bar.

Amendingen and Eisenburg have their own historical coats of arms.

Culture and main attractions

Historic festivals
Every year Memmingen celebrates the Fischertag (Fisherman's day), recreating medieval traditions. The town brook is fished out to be completely drained and cleaned, and at the same time a "Fisherman's King" (the one that caught the heaviest trout) is appointed among almost 1,200 fishermen. Every year up to 40,000 people come to this festival as participants or spectators.

Theatre

The theatre has a long tradition in Memmingen. By the Middle Ages some chroniclers were already recording different theatre performances. In 1937 the Landestheater Schwaben (State Theatre of Swabia) or LTS was founded in the town. In 1945, after World War II, the LTS was one of the first theatres in West Germany to begin putting on performances again. The performances take place in the Rooms of the Town Theatre, the theatre at the Schweizerberg (cabaret stage), in the Kaminwerk cultural centre or in rooms at the boroughs of Memmingen. The Schweizerberg Theatre will be closed at the end of 2010. It will move to new premises in the Elsbethen area, behind the Town Theatre, where a new cabaret stage, rehearsing rooms, workshops, depots, management rooms, the foyer and some guest rooms will be built.
Another theatre was founded by Helmut Wolfseher and members of the Alternative Kleinkunst e.V. (Alternative Cabaret Society), Parterretheater im Künerhaus (PIK). This theatre is specifically for amateur actors and young talented musicians. The Kaminwerk also puts on major plays by amateur actors. The municipal hall is for Volksschauspieler or other artists.

The following works featuring Memmingen have been produced:

 Stage play Memmingen from Bettina Fless (1989)
 Book Mohr of Memmingen from Utz Benkel
 Song Memmingen by Blackmore’s Night, see also Shadow of the Moon

Stage plays and operas that have had world premières in Memmingen are:
 1995: The Jewbank
 Metal-Operas by David DeFeis:
 1999: Klytaimnestra
 2001: Hel
 2005: Lilith
 2005: Mohr of Memmingen
 2007: Green Organes
 2008: Katharina and Till (10 January 2009)

Museums

The biggest museum in Memmingen is the Town Museum at the Hermannsbau. The town's history is described in its historical rooms. There is also a section covering the history of the Jewish community in Memmingen, whose members were killed or forced into exile in 1939. Part of the Torah from the destroyed synagogue is on display there. The Freudenthal/Altvater Homeland Museum for refugees who have settled in Memmingen is also part of the town museum. It is one of 43 homeland museums recognised by the Ministry of the Interior. A foundation, founded and administered by the town, takes responsibility for the museum. The Strigel- and Antoniter-Museum at the Antonierkloster present wood carvings and paintings by the Strigel family of artists as well as a permanent exhibition on the work of the Hospital Brothers of St. Anthony. The museum was established in 1996. With donations from the Memminger Wohnungsbaugenossenschaft (MeWo) the MEWO-Kunsthalle was opened in 2005 in the old post office next to the station. The museum holds the estates of the Memmingen artists Max Unold and Josef Madlener and presents a wide selection of contemporary art exhibitions. The size and scope of this art gallery is unique in region. The former Kreuzherren monastery is used for changing exhibitions.

Music
The organ concerts in the churches of St. Martins and St. Josef are famous in the region. Chamber music would be performed in the former Kreuzherren monastery and also in some other buildings in Memmingen.

There are several pubs, restaurants, wine taverns and cafés and also some discothèques in and around the town. The cultural centre Kaminwerk (Chimney factory) is for concerts, theatre, program cinema, readings and special parties.

Buildings

Memmingen has considerable tourist interest, mainly because large areas of the medieval old town survived World War II. There are ten town gates and towers and about two kilometres of the town wall. The old town contains many interesting houses of patricians, some in the baroque style. They are picturesque Streets with the Stadtbach (town river) beside. The medieval market place, surrounded by the town hall, which is built in renaissance style, the Großzunft (Guildhouse) and the painted Steuerhaus (tax house). Also famous is St. Martin's church, built in gothic style with its more-than-500-year-old Choir and the 1996 restored Hospital Brothers of St. Anthony monastery (Antonierkloster), the oldest, best conserved and biggest of these kind. The probably oldest church in town Unser Frauen (Church of Our Lady) or also called Frauenkirche with significant frescos of the 15th and 16th centuries. Also the Seven Roof House, the baroque Kreuzherren monastery, the renovated whorehouse of the town, the Salzstadel (salt barn), the Kramerzunft (shopkeepers guild, also called the Twelve-Article-House are sights in Memmingen). Not so well known is the Bismarck tower in the west of Memmingen. Beside the tower is the 2007 build new soccer stadium.

Parks
Green areas were created all along the town wall. The old ditches where filled up and replaced with green areas or parks with partially over 150-year-old trees. The name of the parks are (starting clockwise at the Ulmer Gate): Hubergarten, Zollergarten, Ratzengraben/Zollergraben, Kohlschanze, Reichshain, Kaisergraben, Hohe Wacht, Westertorplatz, Grimmelschanze. Nearby every residential area has its own smaller parks. There is also the town park in the New World, the old Landesgartenschau place. Also the old and the forest cemetery, which are both used as parks.

Cemeteries

There were four cemeteries in Memmingen in the Middle Ages. They were around the St. Martin's Church and the Church of Our Lady, also at the Kreuzherren monastery and the Scottish monastery. They were abandoned in 1530. The replacement was the Old cemetery at the former Scottish monastery. This cemetery was abandoned in 1930. The closing of the Old Cemetery has involved a new Cemetery. It was founded in the east of Memmingen as a Forest Cemetery. More cemeteries are in the districts Amendingen, Steinheim, Buxach, Volkratshofen, Ferthofen and Dickenreishausen. In the east of the town is also a Jewish cemetery.

Twin towns – sister cities

Memmingen is twinned with:

 Glendale, United States (1976)
 Province of Teramo, Italy (1981)
 Teramo, Italy (1986)
 Auch, France (1990)
 Eisleben, Germany (1990)
 Kiryat Shmona, Israel (2009)
 Karataş, Turkey (2009)
 Litzelsdorf, Austria (2009)
 Chernihiv, Ukraine (2009)

Friendly cities
Memmingen also has friendly relations with:
 Colmar, France (1965)

Notable people
Bernhard Walther (1430–1504), merchant, humanist and astronomer
Bernhard Strigel (1461–1528), portrait and historical painter
Johann Heiss (1640–1704), painter
Gertrud Otto (1895–1970), art historian
Franz Roth (born 1946), footballer
Heinrich Bedford-Strohm (born 1960), Lutheran bishop
Holger Badstuber (born 1989), footballer
Timo Gebhart (born 1989), footballer
Sergejs Boldaveško (born 1970), hockey player
Mario Götze (born 1992), footballer

References

External links

 
Memmingen Online 

 
Free imperial cities
Holocaust locations in Germany